Lyman Wellington Thayer (October 30, 1854February 8, 1919) was an American farmer and Republican politician from the U.S. state of Wisconsin.  He was the 38th mayor of Ripon, Wisconsin, (1916–1918) and represented Fond du Lac County in the Wisconsin State Senate and Assembly during the 1890s.

Biography
Thayer was born on October 30, 1854 in Wausau, Wisconsin. He moved to Ripon, Wisconsin in 1886. Thayer died in Ripon on February 8, 1919.

Career
Thayer was Chairman of Ripon and of the Fond du Lac County, Wisconsin Board of Supervisors. He was elected to the Assembly in 1892 and to the Senate in 1894. After leaving the Senate, he served as mayor of Ripon from 1916 to 1918. Thayer was a Republican.

References

External links
 

Politicians from Wausau, Wisconsin
People from Ripon, Wisconsin
Republican Party Wisconsin state senators
Republican Party members of the Wisconsin State Assembly
Mayors of places in Wisconsin
County supervisors in Wisconsin
1854 births
1919 deaths
19th-century American politicians